Dichomeris barbella is a moth of the family Gelechiidae. It is found in Germany, Austria, Slovakia, the Czech Republic, Italy, Hungary, Romania, North Macedonia and Ukraine.

The wingspan is 18–22 mm. Adults are on wing from May to July in one generation per year.

The larvae feed on Prunus species, including Prunus spinosa and Prunus domestica.

References

Moths described in 1775
barbella
Moths of Europe
Moths of Asia